Futebol Clube do Porto, commonly referred to as FC Porto, or simply Porto, is a Portuguese professional basketball team based in Porto. Created in 1926, it is the senior representative side of the basketball section of multi-sports club FC Porto. The team competes domestically in the Liga Portuguesa de Basquetebol (LPB) and internationally in FIBA Europe competitions, such as the Champions League and the FIBA Europe Cup.

It plays its home matches at the Dragão Arena, alongside the club's handball and roller hockey teams, and is managed by Galician head coach Moncho López since 2009.

In 2012, the section was reformulated and the senior team was disbanded in favor of a youth team called "Dragon Force", which began competing in the third-tier CNB 1. The team was promoted to the LPB in 2015 and changed its name back to FC Porto.

History

Foundation
The introduction of the sport in Portugal took place in 1913, and thirteen years later in 1926 a group of partners of the club decided to create a basketball team. António Sanches, António Marta and Daniel Barbosa drove the idea, having them joined by Gabriel Batista and A. Cabral to complete the team. The second place in the Cup António Cardoso guaranteed in the first season excites the community that forms immediately four other basketball teams. FC Porto basketball players trained in an outdoor field complex included in Campo da Constituição.

Early years
The decades of the thirties and forties were not very fertile in securities for the basketball section of FC Porto, but still the sport was up solidifying a club that showed increasingly eclectic. In the year 1933, the first Campeonato de Portugal was played, and Porto participated alongside Conimbricense, Académico, Fluvial, Guifões, Sp. Braga, Atlético de Braga and Sporting de Gouveia. In 1940, FC Porto have played in a covered, lighted, on Avenida dos Aliados enclosure. The fruit came in late because in 1947–48 and 1949–50 FC Porto was national champion of the second division and two seasons later was national champion in the First Division in 1951–52 and 1952–53.

The 1990s achievements
The year 1995 marks a crucial turning point in Portuguese basketball. It is in this year that the League Basketball Club, founded six years earlier, organized the first professional league. The FC Porto basketball section is associated with a sponsor at the time the UBP (going to be appointed FC Porto UBP), and enters with his right foot in the era of professional basketball, winning the first two editions of the league. Around the same time, the team moved to the Pavilhão Rosa Mota, which would provide better working conditions. In 1997 it is created the FC Porto, Basquetbol, SAD, alongside FC Porto Futebol, SAD. The president Jorge Nuno Pinto da Costa accumulated the presidency of both SADs and the club, while Fernando Gomes became the primary administrator.

Although nationally FC Porto is among the best title contenders in all competitions, their performance at the international level is modest, reflecting the position of the Portuguese Basketball against the other European and world federations. Their best European performance succeeded in 1997 and 2000, years that reached the quarter-finals of the FIBA Saporta Cup (in 1997 still called FIBA EuroCup). In between, in 1999, Paulo Pinto, then Porto player, was elected by FIBA as one of the 50 best players in Europe and, as such, included in the list of candidates to join the western selection EURO ALL STAR.

Recent years
At the end of the 2011–12 season the responsible section informed the coaching staff, which was represented by head coach Moncho López, assistant coach Diogo Gomes, and players (captain Nuno Marçal, André Bessa and David Gomes attended) that the senior team would not compete in the major league championship after losing to Benfica at the Dragão Arena. A new project for the section which fielded players from the section's youth ranks was initiated, they started training under the designation Dragon Force who competed in the national championship CNB third division in season 2012/2013, participating in the final competition. The team secured promotion to the second-tier Proliga in 2013–14, winning that season's title in a playoff final against Illiabum.

Having earned the right to compete in the LPB, the club decided to remain in the Proliga for the 2014–15 season. The team defended their Proliga title without losing any match, and were promoted to the 2015–16 LPB. Competing again under the name of FC Porto, the team qualified for the championship playoffs and reached the final, where they beat the four-time defending champions Benfica to secure the club's 12th title.

Current roster

Honours
Portuguese League
Winners (12): 1951–52, 1952–53, 1971–72, 1978–79, 1979–80, 1982–83, 1995–96, 1996–97, 1998–99, 2003–04, 2010–11, 2015–16

Portuguese Cup
Winners (14): 1978–79, 1985–86, 1986–87, 1987–88, 1990–91, 1996–97, 1998–99, 1999–00, 2003–04, 2005–06, 2006–07, 2009–10, 2011–12, 2018–19

League Cup / Hugo dos Santos Cup
Winners (8): 1999–00, 2001–02, 2003–04, 2007–08, 2009–10, 2011–12, 2015–16, 2020–21

Portuguese Super Cup
Winners (7): 1986, 1997, 1999, 2004, 2011, 2016, 2019

António Pratas Trophy (LPB)
Winners (1): 2010–11

Champions Tournament
Winners (1): 2005–06

Dragon Force
Proliga
Winners (2): 2013–14, 2014–15

António Pratas Trophy (Proliga)
Winners (1): 2014–15

Former notable players
Won an official title or individual titles

  Fernando Assunção (9 seasons: 1966–76)
  Alberto Babo (10 seasons: 1968–74, 1975–79)
  Fernando Gomes (13 seasons: 1969–82)
  Rui Pereira (10 seasons: 1976–84, 1985–87)
  Zé Quintela (7 seasons: 1977–81, 1983–86)
  Tó Ferreira (9 seasons: 1979–83, 1984–89)
  Júlio Matos (15 seasons: 1979–89, 1990–94)
  Beto Van Zeller (6 seasons: 1980–84, 1985–87)
  Charles Payton (1 season: 1982–83)
  Pedro Miguel (5 seasons: 1985–90)
  José Cardoso (7 seasons: 1985–90, 1993–95)
  Steve Rocha (5 seasons: 1986–88, 1989–92)
  Fernando Sá (12 seasons: 1987–99)
  Rui Santos (11 seasons: 1988–97, 1998–2001)
  Wayne Engelstad (2 seasons: 1992–93, 1998–99)
  João Rocha (11 seasons: 1992–98, 1999–2001, 2002–04, 2005–06)
  Nuno Marçal (16 seasons: 1992–99, 2000–03, 2006–12)
  Paulo Pinto (6 seasons: 1994–2000)
  Miguel Miranda (8 seasons: 1996–2000, 2010–12, 2016–18)
  Elvis Évora (7 seasons: 1998–2005)
  Paulo Cunha (11 seasons: 1999–2010)
  Reggie Geary (1 season: 2001–02)
  Heshimu Evans (2 seasons: 2003–05)
  Carlos Andrade (4 seasons: 2003–04, 2009–12)
  Rodrigo Mascarenhas (3 seasons: 2004–07)
  Julian Terrell (3 seasons: 2007–08, 2009–11)
  Ferrán Ventura (6 seasons: 2013–19)
  Troy DeVries (1 season: 2015–16)
  Jalen Riley (1 season: 2020–21)

References

External links
  

FC Porto
Basketball teams in Portugal
Basketball teams in Porto
Basketball teams established in 1926
1926 establishments in Portugal